The Borlée family is a sporting family consisting of many athletes, one of whom, the progenitor Jacques, became a coach in the world of athletics.

The family
The progenitor of the Borlee family is Jacques (born 1957), bronze medalist at the 1983 European Indoor Championships in Budapest on 200 m, while his first wife Edith Demaertelaere (born 1964) was a good sprinter with a personal best of 23.89. Six of his seven children are athletes (the first five born from the first marriage with Edith, the last two born from a second marriage).

The eldest daughter Olivia (born 1986) won the silver medal at the Olympics, which was upgraded to gold in 2016 due to the Russian team's disqualification due to doping, and the world bronze at the 2007 Osaka World Championships with the 4 × 100 m relay and the other daughter Alizia (born 1991) was also a decent sprinter. The four sons are all 400 m specialists, the twins Jonathan and Kevin (born 1988), both Olympic finalists in London 2012, Dylan (born 1992) and the youngest Rayane. In addition, Jacques' older brother Jean-Pierre (born 1947) was also a sprinter.

In 2015 the Belgian men's 4 × 400 metres relay team won the Belgian National Sports Merit Award (Trophée national du Mérite sportif) award assigned to the components Dylan Borlée, Jonathan Borlée, Kevin Borlée, Antoine Gillet et Julien Watrin.

In an interview of 21 August 2013 released to the major Italian sports newspaper, La Gazzetta dello Sport, Jacques Borlée stated that he was inspired by his training methods to Sandro Calvesi, in turn the progenitor of one of the greatest families of Italian athletics, the Ottoz family. Calvesi was in fact the husband of the Berlin Olympian 1936 Gabre Gabric, father-in-law of the Olympic bronze medalist in the 110 m hs in Mexico City 1968, Eddy Ottoz and father of Lyana Calvesi, current president of the Atletica Calvesi club and coach of the sprinter Eleonora Marchiando.

Palmarès

The Borlées have won medals in all five main competitions, namely: the Olympic Games (the gold medal by Olivia Borlée in 4×100 metres relay at Beijing 2008), the World Championships, both outdoor and indoor, the European Championships, both outdoor and indoor.

And again at the World Relays, in the European Team Championships (First League), in the Continental Cup, at the Francophone Games. And finally, at the youth level, the silver medal in the 400 m at the European U23 Championships by Dylan Borlée.

Individual medals

See also
 Borlée
 Belgian men's 4 × 400 metres relay team

Notes

References

External links
The Borlées on Twitter

Athletics in Belgium
Italian families
Sports families